Dashe's nectar bat (Hsunycteris dashe) is a bat species from Bolivia, Colombia, Ecuador, and Peru. It was cited as a member of the genus Hsunycteris before it was formally described.

References

Bats of South America
Hsunycteris
Mammals of Peru
Mammals described in 2017